Crown American is a privately held American company that manages and develops commercial real estate. The corporate headquarters is in downtown Johnstown, Pennsylvania, in a building designed by architect Michael Graves.

History 
The company was founded in 1950 as Crown Construction. Frank J. Pasquerilla, who joined less than a year later, became president in 1956 and sole owner in 1961. The company's name was changed to Crown American in 1972 and in 1979 it acquired the Hess's department store chain.

In 1993, the company split into two entities. The shopping mall portion of the company became a publicly held real estate investment trust, Crown American Realty Trust, and Crown American Hotels controlled the company's hospitality businesses. At its peak, Crown American operated 30 shopping malls, the Hess's department store chain (with 73 locations), and 20 hotels and motels.

In 2003 the shopping mall development and management unit, Crown American Realty Trust, was sold to Pennsylvania Real Estate Investment Trust. The hospitality unit, Crown American Hotels, was retained. In 2005, 22 of the company's 26 hotels were acquired by W2001 Eastern Hotel Realty, an affiliate of the Archon Group, which assumed responsibility for their management.

Frank Pasquerilla died from a stroke in 1999. His son, Mark E. Pasquerilla, serves as chairman of Crown American Hotels. Mark Pasquerilla joined the company in 1981 and was named president in 1990. He is a graduate of the University of Notre Dame, completed a master of science degree in international relations at the London School of Economics, and studied international affairs at the University of Cologne. Michael Barletta is president and chief executive officer.

List of former malls 
Crown American has owned a total of 30 shopping malls during its history. When they merged with PREIT in 2003, they owned 26 malls, and were partners in one other. Crown American also owned a ground lease for an anchor pad at the Westgate Mall in Bethlehem, Pennsylvania, though they did not own the mall itself.

Notes

References

 New York Times, "Pennsylvania REIT to Buy Crown American Realty Trust," May 15, 2003.
 Press Release - 14 May 2003 of Pennsylvania Real Estate Investment Trust:  Pennsylvania Real Estate Investment Trust and Crown American Realty Trust Announce Merger Agreement; Combined Company to Become a Leading Mid-Atlantic Shopping Mall REIT
 "Family pledges $5 million to fund spiritual center," Intercom Online, Volume 27, Issue 26, Pennsylvania State University, April 2, 1998.
 Tomas Kellner, "Open for Business," Forbes Magazine, September 6, 2004.
 "IRWeblink." IRWeblink. N.p., n.d. Web. 30 Nov. 2013

External links
 Crown American Hotels website
 Archon Hospitality
 Pennsylvania Real Estate Investment Trust

Privately held companies based in Pennsylvania
Johnstown, Pennsylvania
Hospitality companies of the United States
Shopping center management firms
Real estate companies established in 1950
Michael Graves buildings
1950 establishments in Pennsylvania